Septoria citri is a fungal plant pathogen infecting citruses.

References

External links
 Index Fungorum
 USDA ARS Fungal Database

citri
Fungi described in 1877
Fungal citrus diseases